The 2013-14 edition of the Lebanese FA Cup is the 42nd edition to be played. It is the premier knockout tournament for football teams in Lebanon.

The winners qualify for the 2015 AFC Cup.

The qualifying rounds take place in late 2013 with the Premier League clubs joining at the Round of 16 in early 2014.

Round of 16

Quarter finals

Semi finals

Final

External links
http://www.futbol24.com/national/Lebanon/Lebanese-Cup/2013-2014/ name=Futbol24.com 
soccerway.com

Lebanese FA Cup seasons
Cup
Leb